The Alfred-class ships of the line were a class of four 74-gun third rates for the Royal Navy by Sir John Williams.

Ships

Builder: Deptford Dockyard
Ordered: 21 July 1773
Launched: 8 October 1778
Fate: Broken up, 1819

Builder: Chatham Dockyard
Ordered: 13 August 1772
Launched: 22 October 1778
Fate: Broken up, 1814

Builder: Portsmouth Dockyard
Ordered: 13 July 1773
Launched: 18 October 1781
Fate: Broken up, 1857

Builder: Chatham Dockyard
Ordered: 16 July 1774
Laid Down: 30 January 1775
Launched: 28 August 1779
Completed for Sea: 23 September 1779
Fate: Broken up, 1818

 A fifth ship Edgar was also ordered (16 July 1774) to this design, but on 25 August 1774 was altered to the modified Arrogant design.

Notes

References

 Lavery, Brian, The Ship of the Line – Volume 1: The development of the battlefleet 1650–1850, 1983, 
 Lyon, David, The Sailing Navy List, All the Ships of the Royal Navy – Built, Purchased and Captured 1688–1860, pub Conway Maritime Press, 1993, 
 Winfield, Rif, British Warships of the Age of Sail 1714–1792: Design, Construction, Careers and Fates, pub Seaforth, 2007,

External links
 

 
Ship of the line classes
Ship classes of the Royal Navy